Those Who Love is a 1926 silent film, produced in Australia, about the son of a knight who falls in love with a dancer. Only part of the film survives today and it is held by the National Film and Sound Archive.

Plot
Barry Manton, William Carter, the son of Sir James, falls in love with a dancer, Bebe Doree but his father disapproves and bribes Bebe to disappear. Hurt, Barry leaves home and becomes a labourer on the docks. He meets poor but honest Lola Quayle in a cabaret and offers her a place to live after she resists the advances of a pub owner. They stay in separate rooms but fall in love during a storm and he later marries her. Barry's father wants him to return home and sends a solicitor over to approach him. Not wanting to get between Barry and his family, Lola runs away.

Years later, Barry lives in an attic, having rejected wealth and position and taken to drink, while Lola works as a nurse, looking after their son, Peter. Barry is injured and Lola recognises him at hospital. She visits Sir James and asks for money for a specialist and the family is united.

Cast
Marie Lorraine as Lola Quayle
William Carter as Barry Manton
Robert Purdie as Sir James Manton
Sylvia Newland as Bebe Doree
George Dean as Parker
Kate Trefle as Lady Manton
Big Bill Wilson as Ace Skinner
Charles Beetham as Austin Mann
Reginald Reeves as Sir Furneaux Reeves
Jackie Williamson as Peter
Nellie Ferguson as nurse
Howard Harris as doctor
Edith Hodgson 
Herbert Walton

Production
This was the first feature film from the McDonagh sisters, Paulette, Phyllis and Isobel. They came up with the story in the prep room of their own boarding school. Says Phyllis McDonagh:
In those days every Australian-made film made us out to be a lot of bushwhackers, on the 'Dad and Dave' theme. The three of us talked and talked and decided if Australia was going to compete overseas we'd have to meet overseas standards by making interior films – technically difficult then.

The film was entirely financed by the girl's father. Says Phyllis:
Father always believed in us. And when we proved on paper we knew what we were about, he let us have our head. We had a down-to-earth approach. We thought well ahead and planned the details meticulously. We knew talent wasn't enough if it was half baked.

The McDonaghs formed a production company, MCD Productions, and started pre-production. Isobel was to star, Phyllis was to do production design and publicity, and Paulette would help with direction. Before filming commenced, their father died of a heart attack. Their mother was a trained nurse and a group of Sydney doctors suggested she open a convalescent home for their use. The family moved into "Drummoyne House", a 22-room house in the Sydney suburb of Drummoyne built by convicts. Two wings were set aside for the convalescent home and another section was turned into a film studio.

The McDonaghs originally hired P. J. Ramster to direct but were unhappy with his work and replaced him with Paulette. The interiors were shot mostly at the home in Drummoyne, with additional scenes filmed at the Bondi studios of Australasian Films and exteriors done around Sydney.

Shooting took four weeks in all. A number of days were lost when the cast and crew's eyes were damaged from the lights, and their cinematographer fell ill with influenza.

Release
The film was given a vice-regal premiere in September 1926 attended by Governor Sir Dudley de Chair, whose daughter Elaine had a part in the film. Dr McDonagh had been J. C. Williamson's surgeon and the film was distributed commercially by J. C. Williamson Ltd It performed well at the box office, with Phyllis McDonagh later claiming the movie earned twice its cost.

Gregory Balcombe of Union Theatres said his company distributed the film to help the local industry, although it should not have cost more than £1,000.

References

External links

Those Who Love at National Film and Sound Archive
Original treatment of film at National Archives of Australia

1926 films
Australian drama films
Australian silent feature films
Australian black-and-white films
1926 drama films
Silent drama films
1920s English-language films